Oras may refer to:

Places

 Oras, Eastern Samar, a municipality in the Philippines
 Oraș, the term for "town" in Romania and Moldova

People

Surname
Allan Oras (born 1975), Estonian cyclist
 Ants Oras (1900–1982), Estonian translator and writer

Given name
 Lee Oras Overholts (1890 – 1946), American mycologist
 Oras Sattar (b. 1981), Iraqi singer, composer and songwriter
 Oras Tynkkynen (born 1977), Member of the Parliament of Finland

Other uses

 Oras (company), a Finnish faucet manufacturer
 Pokémon Omega Ruby and Alpha Sapphire, the 2014 Nintendo 3DS remakes of Pokémon Ruby and Sapphire
 24 Oras, national network news program of GMA Network in the Philippines

See also
 Ora (disambiguation)

Estonian-language surnames